= SMA Negeri 6 Bandung =

- Jalan Pasirkaliki No.51, Bandung, Indonesia

Information
- Type: Public School
- Motto: "Mengolah Potensi, Mewujudkan Prestasi"
- Established: 1956
- Principal: Isnaeni Zakiah, S.Pd,.M.M.Pd.
- Enrollment: approx. 350/year
- Website: SMA Negeri 6 Bandung Website

SMA Negeri 6 Bandung (also known as SMU 6 Bandung, SMA 6 Bandung or Sekolah Menengah Atas Negeri 6 Bandung) is a public senior high school in Bandung, West Java, Indonesia. SMAN 6 Bandung was established in 1956, and Located in Jalan Pasirkaliki No.51, Bandung.

== History ==
SMA Negeri 6 Bandung was established in 1956, originally located in Jalan Belitung No.22. But in 1966, SMA Negeri 6 Bandung, occupied former Chinese school building, Nan Hua, in Jalan Pasirkaliki No.51 Bandung. And at the same time, SMA Negeri 6 Bandung has divided into two building, one in Jalan Belitung No.22, and one again in Jalan Pasirkaliki No. 51.

In 1976, SMAN 6 Bandung, just have one building which located at Jalan Pasirkaliki No. 51 Bandung, Building in Jalan Belitung No.22 Bandung, become SMAN 9 Bandung (now situated at Jalan LTU Suparmin, Bandung)
